Valery Valeryevich Nikolaev (born 23 August 1965) is a Russian film and theater actor, director.

Career
Nikolaev has choreographed five productions at the Chekhov MKhAT theater. He choreographed the musical My Fair Lady  (Moscow, 2000), as well. In 1997 he traveled to Hollywood to play in Phillip Noyce's The Saint. Nikolaev graduated from MKhAT, where he studied under Oleg Tabakov. After graduation, Nikolaev performed with the Chekhov MKhAT theater.

Selected filmography
He performed in more than thirty films since 1987.

External links

Russian Wikipedia

Russian male film actors
Soviet male actors
1965 births
Living people
Male actors from Moscow
Russian male television actors
Russian male stage actors
20th-century Russian male actors
21st-century Russian male actors
Moscow Art Theatre School alumni